Metlakatla may refer to:

 Metlakatla, Alaska (also known as New Metlakatla)
 Metlakatla, British Columbia